Rabbi is Rabbi Shergill's debut album released in 2004 by Phat Phish Records. The album was an instant hit and grabbed notable airtime on Indian radio. While the company initially only put out 10,000 copies for sale, the album went on to sell in excess of 100,000 copies.

Track listing
All songs composed by Rabbi Shergill.

 "Bulla Ki Jana" - 5:16
 "Tere Bin" - 5:20
 "Heer" - 5:25
 "Ishtihar" - 6:32
 "Totia Manmotia" - 4:36
 "Ajj Nachna" - 4:07
 "Gill 'Te Guitar" - 4:34
 "Ek Geet Hijar Da" - 4:44
 "Jugni" - 4:35

References

2004 debut albums
Rabbi Shergill albums